Arvid Ringstrand (February 3, 1888 – December 1, 1957) was a Swedish athlete.  He competed at the 1908 Summer Olympics in London. In the 400 metres, Ringstrand finished third in his preliminary heat and did not advance to the semifinals.

References

Sources
 
 
 

1888 births
1957 deaths
Athletes (track and field) at the 1908 Summer Olympics
Olympic athletes of Sweden
Swedish male sprinters